Firew Solomon Ayele (born 18 September 1992) is an Ethiopian professional footballer who plays as an winger for Ethiopian Premier League club Sidama Coffee and the Ethiopia national team.

Club career
Solomon began his career with the Ethiopian club Defence Force, and helped them win the 2015 Ethiopian Cup. On 2 August 2016, he transferred to Hawassa City. Iin 2018, he returned to Defence Force. He had a maligned stint Wolkite City in the 2020–21 season, where he left after accusations of drinking and harassing teammates. 2021, he moved to Sidama Coffee.

International career
Solomon made his international debut with the Ethiopia national team in a 1–0 friendly loss to Zambia on 7 June 2015. He was part of the Ethiopia squad at the 2021 Africa Cup of Nations.

Personal life
Solomon is known by the nickname Taquru ("the strong" ) in Ethiopia. He is a Christian.

Honours
Defense Force
Ethiopian Cup: 2015

References

External links
 
 

1992 births
Living people
Ethiopian footballers
Association football wingers
Ethiopia international footballers
Ethiopian Premier League players
Defence Force S.C. players
Hawassa City S.C. players
Wolkite City F.C. players
Sidama Coffee S.C. players
2021 Africa Cup of Nations players